The St. Andreasberg rack railway operated a now-closed, standard gauge, rack railway in the Upper Harz in central Germany. To begin with its shareholders were the state of Prussia, the Province of Hanover und the town of Sankt Andreasberg. After 1924, it was operated by the Hanover State Light Railway Office.

History 
The Oder Valley Railway opened in 1884, before the rack railway was built. This line connected Sankt Andreasberg via Bad Lauterberg to the South Harz Railway (Northeim–Nordhausen) in Scharzfeld. The station was located at the foot of the Glockenberg hill.

The location of the Oder Valley Railway station, remote from the village centre in a deep valley, was rather inconvenient for the townsfolk of St. Andreasberg. So as early as 23 June 1903, the local council had sent proposals to the railway administration in Kassel explaining three options for extending the railway to the town centre. Extending the adhesion-based Oder Valley Railway did not seem feasible due to the high cost. The railway had to climb 70 metres in height, which would have been only possible by artificially extending the line to achieve an acceptable grade for an adhesion railway. As a result, a rack railway based on the Abt system was proposed. Three different options for the route were evaluated:

 following the road through the Sperrlutter valley with a maximum gradient of 1 in 12
 following the Wäschegrund with a comparable incline
 climbing out of the Sperrlutter Valley and cutting through the Grüner Hirsch with a maximum gradient of 1 in 6

After further negotiations it was decided in 1906 to build the third option with a slightly altered loop and a maximum gradient of 1 in 8.2. Construction started on 1 April 1911. During the winter of 1912/13, work had to be halted for several months, which meant that laying the track and the rack rail only started in April 1913. The route was 1,636.15 metres long and required 1,543.61 metres of double-bar, rack rail. The concession to operate the railway was received on 5 June 1911. It was granted by the district president of Hanover and permitted the operation of a steam railway for the next 100 years.

The rack railway was officially opened on 19 June 1913, but goods operations had already started 3 days earlier so that employees could familiarise themselves with the operation. The railway had two, triple-axle, rack railway, steam engines and two, twin-axle, passenger coaches.

The railway become unprofitable in the 1950s and should have been modernized. In addition, safety had become a concern after an accident on the Drachenfels Railway. This led to the closure of the railway on 17 August 1959.

Rack rail operation 

On 19 July 1913 the line was officially opened at the Stadtbahnhof station on the Glockenberg. Goods workings had started three days earlier in order to familiarize railway staff with operations. Initially, five pairs of trains were timetabled daily, each with a journey time of about 15 minutes (at a top speed of 8 km/h). In the 1920s, only two pairs of trains ran daily due to the effects of the First World War, a lack of coal and declining goods and passenger traffic), and, from 1932, even busses and lorries were used. The Second World War and Deutsche Bundesbahn's intentions to close the line from Bad Lauterberg to St. Andreasberg West caused further problems. Only a great storm of protest kept the Oder Valley Railway open and also encouraged plans to modernise the rack railway. But neither the acquisition of a modern diesel rack railway locomotive, which could run through from Scharzfeld to St. Andreasberg, nor the electrification of the line could be carried out due to cost. The last attempt to save the line was the use of DB Class VT 98 railbuses: Dr. Paul Schöning, head of the Brunswick mechanical engineering department, drove a railbus without any authority or permission, on the inclined part of the route on 18 September 1957 and determined that the railbus would have had to be fitted with additional brakes for the downhill run. But they were never employed in service.

Closure 

In 1955, the Lower Saxony Ministry for the Economy and Transport warmed that operations on the St. Andreasberg rack railway were very unprofitable. Rapidly rising traffic on the roads and the lack of modernization of the line made the end of the rack railway ever more likely.

A serious accident on the Drachenfels Railway in September 1958, which killed 18 and injured 100 people, was cited, at a business meeting on 28. November 1958, in announcing the closure of the line in Sankt Andreasber. Consequently, rail services ceased on 1 January 1959 after 46 years of operations, on safety grounds, even though the cause of the accident on the Drachenfels line was not directly applicable. The last train probably worked the line on 23 April 1959.

On 17 August 1959 the rack railway was officially closed and work began immediately on lifting the track. The St. Andreasberg Railway Company (St. Andreasberger Eisenbahn GmbH) operated a bus service until 30 May 1965 when it was taken over by the DB.

The surviving station building was a resort administrative office and then, until 2005, an artist's studio. The large roof overhang is a bus station today. The old trackbed has been partially tarmacked and leads to the barbecue site of Waldarbeiter. In addition the old locomotive shed is used by a local bus company as a garage.

Sources

External links 
 www.werkbahn.de about the cog railway
 1944 timetable

Railway lines in Lower Saxony
Defunct railway companies of Germany
Transport in the Harz
Sankt Andreasberg
Rack railways in Germany